Winchmore Hill railway station is in Station Road (which, before the arrival of the railway, was known as "Middle Lane"), Winchmore Hill in the London Borough of Enfield in North London, England, in Travelcard Zone 4. The station, and all trains serving it are operated by Great Northern. Originally, upon opening in 1871, the station building was almost identical to that at neighbouring Palmers Green. However, in 1965 the northbound side of the building was demolished due to subsidence. In the 1970s the station boasted, on its southbound platform, a small newsagent and sweet shop, just beyond the base of the stairs down to the platform, but by 1980 this shop had been dismantled.

Services
All services at Winchmore Hill are operated by Great Northern using  EMUs.

The typical off-peak service in trains per hour is:
 2 tph to 
 2 tph to  via 

Developments

 Oyster pay and go arrived at this station on 2 January 2010.

Connections
London Buses routes W9 and 456 serve the station.

References

External links

Railway stations in the London Borough of Enfield
Former Great Northern Railway stations
Railway stations in Great Britain opened in 1871
Railway stations served by Govia Thameslink Railway
Winchmore Hill